The 2006 season was SK Brann's 98th season and their 20th consecutive season in the Norwegian Premier League. The season opened on 10 April, with a tie in Fredrikstad, in a match best remembered by an impressive scissor kick goal from Charlie Miller. 8 month later, on 10 December, Brann finished the season with a tie against Helsingborgs IF in their last group stage match in the 2006-07 Royal League.

Information

Manager:  Mons Ivar Mjelde
League: Norwegian Premier League
Shirt supplier:  Umbro (Kappa from 1 December)
Shirt sponsor: Sparebanken Vest
Highest league attendance: 19,348 (v Rosenborg, October 22)
Lowest league attendance: 13,528 (v Lillestrøm, April 18)
Average league attendance: 16,707 
League: Silver 
Norwegian Cup: 4th round
Europe: UEFA Cup, second qualifying round
Royal League: Quarter finals 
Top goalscorer league: Bengt Sæternes, 10 goals
Top goalscorer season: Bengt Sæternes, 11 goals
Player of the year: Håkon Opdal

Squad 

 
 (until October 2006) 
 
 (injured whole season) 

 (C)
 (from June 2006)
 

 

 (from September 2006)

 (until July 2006) 
 

 (until August 2006)
 (from September 2006)

 (injured most of the season)
 

 
 
 (from August 2006)

Results 

SK Brann entered the summer break as undefeated league leaders. Their win–loss record in the league was 7-4-0 with 19 goals for and 7 goals against.

Highlights 

10 April: Opening day of the season. Brann plays a 1-1 draw against Fredrikstad FK in Fredrikstad, best remembered by a scissor kick goal from Charlie Miller.
30 April: Brann beats the reigning champions, Vålerenga 3-1 in Bergen.
5 June: Rosenborg-Brann 0-0 in front of 19,215 spectators.
8 June: After knocking FBK Voss out of the Norwegian Cup, SK Brann enters the summer break as undefeated league leaders. Their win–loss record in the league is 7-4-0 with 19 goals for and 7 goals against.
2 July: Brann resumes the season in the worst possible way. They lose 0-4 in Hamar against the relegation-fighting Ham-Kam.
20 July: Brann is eliminated from the Norwegian Cup after a 1-3 loss in Kristiansand against IK Start.
27 July: Brann advances to the 2nd UEFA Cup qualifying round, after winning 1-0 against Glentoran FC in both legs.
2 August: Brann loses 0-2 against their biggest rival in the race for Premiership-gold, Lillestrøm SK.
24 August: Brann gets knocked-out of the UEFA Cup after a defeat on aggregate against the amateurs from the Swedish Åtvidabergs FF.
17 September: Brann keeps the gold-dream alive with a 5-3 victory against Sandefjord Fotball.
15 October: Brann loses to FC Lyn Oslo. Their two previous matches gave them one victory and one defeat. The gold race seems to come down to the match between Rosenborg and Brann in Bergen. Brann have to win for gold, while Rosenborg is almost guaranteed the gold medal with a victory over Brann.
22 October: The Brann-Rosenborg showdown saw Rosenborg win 3-1, taking them six points clear of Brann with two rounds left. With an advantage of +13 over Brann in goal difference, Rosenborg are virtually assured of the title (99%), and can remove any doubt by picking up one point in either of their remaining matches.
29 October: Brann beats Ham-Kam 2-0 and secures the silver medals. Rosenborg beats Viking FK, and take home the Norwegian Premier League trophy for the 20th time.
2 November: Sport Director Per Ove Ludvigsen resigned after four year as chief in Brann.
5 November: Brann is defeated in Stavanger, when Viking F.K. won 5-0. Brann's Premiership statistics were. Win/loss: 14-4-7, goals scored: 39  goals against: 36, points: 46.
6 November: Brann prepares for the Royal League-group stage. Brann is in group 1 with the Norwegian champions Rosenborg, the bronzemedalist from Denmark, Odense Boldklub and the number 4 in the Swedish league, Helsingborgs IF.
9 November: Brann wins 3-1 at the Royal League 2006-07 opening game against Rosenborg.
24 November: Roald Bruun-Hanssen is hired as new sports director.
26 November: Brann-Helsingborg 2-2, in the 2nd round of the Royal League. Cato Guntveit played his first match since 24 August, after being troubled with injuries most of the season.
7 December: Brann qualified for the quarterfinals in the Royal League, after defeating Rosenborg 3-2 at home.
10 December: Brann tied with Helsingborg in the last group stage match in the 2006-07 Royal League. The match was also Henrik "Henke" Larsson's last match before his loan-transfer to Manchester United. Both Brann and Helsingborg qualified for the quarterfinal in the Royal League, while Odense finished 3rd and qualified to the quarterfinal as one of the two best 3rd placed teams in the group stage. Rosenborg was eliminated from the tournament.

Matches (goals) 
''Matches and goal are for matches in the Norwegian Premier League, Norwegian Cup, Royal League and European Cup/UEFA Cup, and was last updated after the seasons last game 10 December.

References 

2006
Brann